"Lovin' You" is a 1987 single by the O'Jays from their album, Let Me Touch You, and written by songwriting duo Kenny Gamble and Leon Huff. The single, which topped the Billboard R&B chart for one week, was the O'Jays first number one on that chart since "Use Ta Be My Girl" in 1978. The song is the final O'Jays number one to be written and produced by Gamble and Huff.

Charts

Weekly charts

Year-end charts

References

External links
 

1987 singles
The O'Jays songs
Songs written by Leon Huff
1987 songs
Songs written by Kenny Gamble